St. Sergius of Radonezh Church is an Eastern Orthodox church in Riga, the capital of Latvia. The church is situated at the address 126 Krišjānis Barons Street. Church patron is Sergius of Radonezh.

References 

Churches in Riga